InterMine is an open source data warehouse system, licensed under the LGPL 2.1. InterMine is used to create databases of biological data accessed by sophisticated web query tools. InterMine can be used to create databases from a single data set or can integrate multiple sources of data. Support is provided for several common biological formats and there is a framework for adding other data. InterMine includes a user-friendly web interface that works 'out of the box' and can be easily customised.

InterMine makes it easy to integrate multiple data sources into a single data warehouse. It has a core data model based on the sequence ontology and supports several biological data formats, allowing sysadmins to configure which organisms or data files are required. It is easy to extend the data model and integrate other data, with a web service API, clients in seven different languages, and an XML format to help import custom data.

As an active open source project, InterMine maintains a developer mailing list and thorough developer and user documentation.

Supported data formats 
 Chado
 GFF3
 FASTA
 GO & gene association files
 UniProt XML
 PSI XML (protein interactions, Protein Structure Initiative)
 InParanoid orthologs
 Ensembl

Clients 
Web clients allow users to access the data programatically with minimal effort, and are available for perl, python, ruby, javascript, Java, and R. Data can also be queried via a native Android app.

Web application
The InterMine web application allows creation of custom bioinformatics queries, includes template queries (web forms to run 'canned' queries). Users can upload and operate on lists of data. It is possible to configure/create widgets to analyse lists with graphs and enrichment statistics.

An admin user can publish new template queries, change report pages and create public lists at any time without any programming. Many aspects of the web app can be configured and branded.

Current projects (not exhaustive list) 

An up-to-date list of projects can be viewed at the InterMine Registry

 Generic Model Organism Database
 modENCODE 
 FlyMine
 HumanMine
 RatMine
 YeastMine
 TargetMine
 MitoMiner
 MouseMine
 ZebrafishMine
 WormMine
 INDIGO
 ThaleMine
 TargetMine
 PhytoMine
 MedicMine
 BovineMine
 HymenopteraMine
 SoyMine
 BeanMine
 ChickpeaMine
 LegumeMine
 PeanutMine
 Shaare
 Wheat3Bmine
 PlanMine
 GrapeMine
 RepetDB
 XenMine
 CHOMine

References

External links 
 InterMine
 Department of Genetics, University of Cambridge
 Wellcome Trust
 InterMine API Documentation

Bioinformatics software
Biological databases
Data warehousing products
Genetics in the United Kingdom
Science and technology in Cambridgeshire
South Cambridgeshire District